Senator Bibb may refer to:

George M. Bibb (1776–1859), U.S. Senator from Kentucky from 1829 to 1835
Thomas Bibb (1783–1839), member of the Alabama State Senate from 1819 to 1820
William Wyatt Bibb (1781–1820), U.S. Senator from Georgia from 1813 to 1816